Alfred Cyril Ewing (11 May 1899 – 14 May 1973), usually cited as A. C. Ewing, was an English philosopher and a sympathetic critic of idealism.

Biography
Ewing studied at Oxford, where he gained the John Locke Lectureship and the Green Prize in Moral Philosophy. He taught for four years in Swansea/Wales, and became lecturer in Moral Science at Cambridge in 1931, based at Trinity Hall, and reader in Moral Science in 1954. He was an Honorary Fellow of Jesus College, Cambridge, and one of Wittgenstein's foremost critics.

He was responsible for Karl Popper's invitation to Cambridge. Ewing was an attendee of the Moral Sciences Club and was present at the infamous Wittgeinstein poker incident.

Ewing was viewed negatively by some with Maurice Wiles stating "You felt you were back in school. It was very depressing. He always had a worked out answer to everything" and Professor Michael Wolff calling him a "drab little man".

Georg Kreisel recollects that Ewing wore heavy boots around due to a fear of getting wet and described him as someone who looked like someone who still lived with his mother, which he did.

Ewing was a deeply religious and serious person. On one occasion A.J. Ayer asked him what he was looking most forward to in the afterlife, Ewing responded that God would tell him if there was synthetic a priori.

Philosophical work
Ewing believed that the study of the history of philosophy was important to philosophical practice, and paid particular attention to this in his studies of Kant.

He was a defender of traditional metaphysics (as opposed to post-modern ethics) and developed what has been termed an "analytic idealism". He was a 20th-century pioneer in the philosophy of religion, one of the foremost analysts of the concept "good", and a distinguished contributor to justificatory theorizing about punishment.

He was president of the Aristotelian Society from 1941 to 1942, and he was made a Fellow of the British Academy in 1941.

Wittgenstein and Ewing were rivals, with Ewing stating he did not understand a word Wittgeinstein said and Wittgenstein jibing during a lecture on solipsism that "Let us make the purely hypothetical assumption that Ewing has a mind".

Ewing's 1973 book Value and Reality: The Philosophical Case for Theism argued for philosophical theism.

Books
Kant's Treatment of Causality. London: Kegan Paul, 1924.
The Morality of Punishment. London: Kegan Paul, 1929. New edition, Montclair: Patterson Smith, 1970.
Idealism: A Critical Survey. London: Methuen, 1934. New edition, 1961.
A Short Commentary on Kant's "Critique of Pure Reason". London: Methuen, 1938. New edition, 1950.
Reason and Intuition. London: Humphrey Milford, 1941.
The Individual, the State, and World Government. New YorK: Macmillan, 1947.
The Definition of Good. New York: Macmillan, 1947; London: Routledge and Kegan Paul, 1948.
The Fundamental Questions of Philosophy. London: Routledge and Kegan Paul, 1951. New edition, London: Routledge, 1980.
Ethics. London: English Universities Press, 1953. New editions, New York: Free Press, 1965; London: Teach Yourself Books, 1975.
The Idealist Tradition: from Berkeley to Blanshard; edited, with an introduction and commentary. Glencoe, Ill.: Free Press, 1957.
Second Thoughts in Moral Philosophy. London: Routledge and Kegan Paul, 1959. New edition, 2012.
Non-linguistic Philosophy. London: George Allen & Unwin, 1968.
Value and Reality: the Philosophical Case for Theism. London: George Allen & Unwin, 1973.

Notes

References
 
 Bernd Goebel (2014). "Einleitung". In Alfred Cyril Ewing: Ethik. Eine Einführung (Felix Meiner, Hamburg), vii–lxvii (contains a section on Ewing's life and works and a section on Ewing's moral philosophy). .
 Edmonds, D., Eidinow, J. Wittgenstein's Poker. New York: Ecco 2001.
 A C Ewing Papers at University of Manchester Library.

Ewing, A. C.
Ewing, A. C.
20th-century English philosophers
Philosophical theists
Presidents of the Aristotelian Society